Madadgaar is a 1987 Indian Hindi-language action film, produced by Nirmal Anand under the BNT Films banner and directed by Ramesh Puri. It stars Jeetendra, Sulakshana Pandit in the pivotal roles and music composed by Laxmikant–Pyarelal.

Plot
After a criminal friend uses him as a pawn in a gold smuggling scheme, honest and hardworking Anand (Jeetendra) bravely reports the crime, thus foiling the criminal plan. His bravery attracts the attention of Sunita (Sulakshana Pandit), the daughter of a wealthy industrialist, Sohanlal. The two fall in love, but Sohanlal disapproves of their alliance as Anand is a poor truck driver. Sunita chooses Anand over her father and this causes Sohanlal to suffer a heart attack. Gupta (Madan Puri), the legal advisor of Sohanlal takes full advantage of this situation to usurp Sohanlal's wealth. He along with an ex-convict, Raj (Ranjeet), sends Sohanlal to America for medical treatment, while on the other hand, he plans the killing of Sunita. Anand and Sunita must overcome the objections of Sunita's father, as well as the dangerous machinations of the devious Gupta and his thuggish henchman, Raj.

Cast
 Jeetendra as Anand
 Sulakshana Pandit as Sunita
 Aruna Irani as Guddi
 Ranjeet as Dr. Raj
 Shakti Kapoor as Kader
 Madan Puri as Advocate Gupta
 Amrish Puri as Sunita's Uncle
 Om Shivpuri as Sunita's Uncle
 Manmohan Krishna as Sohanlal
 Lalita Pawar as Sohanlal's Wife

Soundtrack
Lyrics: Anand Bakshi

External links

1980s Hindi-language films
1987 films
Films scored by Laxmikant–Pyarelal